Sherman, New York, is the name of two places in Chautauqua County, New York, USA:

 Sherman (town), New York
 Sherman (village), New York, a village in the northern part of the town